Luxor is a city in Upper Egypt.

Luxor may also refer to:
 Luxor Governorate, the governorate of which Luxor is the capital
 Luxor International Airport, servicing Luxor
 Luxor Museum, museum in Luxor, Egypt
 Luxor Temple, Ancient Egyptian temple complex in Luxor, Egypt
 Luxor, Pennsylvania, United States
 Luxor (album), by Robyn Hitchcock
Luxor (video game) 
Luxor 2
Luxor 3
Luxor: Quest for the Afterlife 
Luxor 5th Passage
 Luxor AB, a Swedish home electronics manufacturer
 Luxor Air, a charter airline based in Egypt
 Luxor Las Vegas, a hotel and casino in Las Vegas, Nevada, United States
 Luxor Peak, a summit in Nevada, US
 Luxor (pen company), an Indian pen manufacturer
 Luxor (film), a 2020 romantic drama film